In mathematics, a Caccioppoli set is a set whose boundary is measurable and has (at least locally) a finite measure. A synonym is set of (locally) finite perimeter. Basically, a set is a Caccioppoli set if its characteristic function is a function of bounded variation.

History 
The basic concept of a Caccioppoli set was first introduced by the Italian mathematician Renato Caccioppoli in the paper : considering a plane set or a surface defined on an open set in the plane, he defined their measure or area as the total variation in the sense of Tonelli of their defining functions, i.e. of their parametric equations, provided this quantity was bounded. The measure of the boundary of a set was defined as a functional, precisely a set function, for the first time: also, being defined on open sets, it can be defined on all Borel sets and its value can be approximated by the values it takes  on an increasing net of subsets. Another clearly stated (and demonstrated) property of this functional was its lower semi-continuity.

In the paper , he precised  by using a triangular mesh as an increasing net approximating the open domain, defining positive and negative variations whose sum is the total variation, i.e. the area functional. His inspiring point of view, as he explicitly admitted, was those of Giuseppe Peano, as expressed by the Peano-Jordan Measure: to associate to every portion of a surface an oriented plane area in a similar way as an approximating chord is associated to a curve. Also, another theme found in this theory was the extension of a functional from a subspace to the whole ambient space: the use of theorems generalizing the Hahn–Banach theorem is frequently encountered in Caccioppoli research. However, the restricted meaning of total variation in the sense of Tonelli added much complication to the formal development of the theory, and the use of a parametric description of the sets restricted its scope.

Lamberto Cesari introduced the "right" generalization of functions of bounded variation to the case of several variables only in 1936: perhaps, this was one of the reasons that induced Caccioppoli to present an improved version of his theory only nearly 24 years later, in the talk  at the IV UMI Congress in October 1951, followed by five notes published in the Rendiconti of the Accademia Nazionale dei Lincei. These notes were sharply criticized by Laurence Chisholm Young in the Mathematical Reviews.

In 1952 Ennio de Giorgi presented his first results, developing the ideas of Caccioppoli, on the definition of the measure of boundaries of sets at the Salzburg Congress of the Austrian Mathematical Society: he obtained this results by using a smoothing operator, analogous to a mollifier, constructed from the Gaussian function, independently proving some results of Caccioppoli. Probably he was led to study this theory by his teacher and friend Mauro Picone, who had also been the teacher of Caccioppoli and was likewise his friend. De Giorgi met Caccioppoli in 1953 for the first time: during their meeting, Caccioppoli expressed a profound appreciation of his work, starting their lifelong friendship. The same year he published his first paper on the topic i.e. : however, this paper and the closely following one did not attracted much interest from the mathematical community. It was only with the paper , reviewed again by Laurence Chisholm Young in the Mathematical Reviews, that his approach to sets of finite perimeter became widely known and appreciated: also, in the review, Young revised  his previous criticism on the work of Caccioppoli.

The last paper of De Giorgi on the theory of perimeters was published in 1958: in 1959, after the death of Caccioppoli, he started to call sets of finite perimeter "Caccioppoli sets". Two years later Herbert Federer and Wendell Fleming published their paper , changing the approach to the theory. Basically they introduced two new kind of currents, respectively normal currents and integral currents: in a subsequent series of papers and in his famous treatise, Federer showed that Caccioppoli sets are normal currents of dimension  in -dimensional euclidean spaces. However, even if the theory of Caccioppoli sets can be studied within the framework of theory of currents, it is customary to study it through the "traditional" approach using functions of bounded variation, as the various sections found in a lot of important monographs in mathematics and mathematical physics testify.

Formal definition 
In what follows, the definition and properties of functions of bounded variation in the -dimensional setting will be used.

Caccioppoli definition 
Definition 1.

If , then we write  for the (global) perimeter.

Definition 2.

 whenever  is open and bounded.

Therefore, a Caccioppoli set has a characteristic function whose total variation is locally bounded. From the theory of functions of bounded variation it is known that this implies the existence of a vector-valued Radon measure  such that

De Giorgi definition 

As one can easily prove,  is a smooth function for all , such that

also, its gradient is everywhere well defined, and so is its absolute value

Having defined this function, De Giorgi gives the following definition of perimeter:

Definition 3.

Actually De Giorgi considered the case : however, the extension to the general case is not difficult. It can be proved that the two definitions are exactly equivalent: for a proof see the already cited De Giorgi's papers or the book . Now having defined what a perimeter is, De Giorgi gives the same definition 2 of what a set of (locally) finite perimeter is.

Basic properties 

The following properties are the ordinary properties which the general notion of a perimeter is supposed to have:

Notions of boundary 

For any given Caccioppoli set  there exist two naturally associated analytic quantities: the vector-valued Radon measure  and its total variation measure . Given that

The topological boundary 

Lemma.

Proof. Let .

Likewise, if  then  for  so

The reduced boundary 

The topological boundary  turns out to be too crude for Caccioppoli sets because its Hausdorff measure overcompensates for the perimeter  defined above. Indeed, the Caccioppoli set

representing a square together with a line segment sticking out on the left has perimeter , i.e. the extraneous line segment is ignored, while its topological boundary

has one-dimensional Hausdorff measure .

We define:

Definition 4.

exists and has length equal to one, i.e. .

That is:

The inclusions above are not necessarily equalities as the previous example shows.

De Giorgi's theorem 

For convenience, in this section we treat only the case where , i.e. the set  has (globally) finite perimeter. De Giorgi's theorem provides geometric intuition for the notion of reduced boundaries and confirms that it is the more natural definition for Caccioppoli sets by showing

i.e. that its Hausdorff measure equals the perimeter of the set. The statement of the theorem is quite long because it interrelates various geometric notions in one fell swoop.

Theorem. Suppose  is a Caccioppoli set.

for every continuous, compactly supported . In fact the subspace  is the orthogonal complement of the unit vector

defined previously. This unit vector also satisfies

 for all Borel sets .

Applications

A Gauss–Green formula 
From the definition of the vector Radon measure  and from the properties of the perimeter, the following formula holds true:

This is one version of the divergence theorem for domains with non smooth boundary. De Giorgi's theorem can be used to formulate the same identity in terms of the reduced boundary  and the approximate inward pointing unit normal vector . Precisely, the following equality holds

See also 

 Geometric measure theory
 Divergence theorem
 Pfeffer integral

Notes

References

Historical references
. A paper surveying the history of the theory of sets of finite perimeter, from the seminal paper of Renato Caccioppoli and the contributions of Ennio De Giorgi to some more recent developments and open problems in metric measure spaces, in Carnot groups and in infinite-dimensional Gaussian spaces.
. The first paper containing the seminal concept of what a Caccioppoli set is.
. The work where Caccioppoli made rigorous and developed the concepts introduced in the preceding paper .
.The first paper detailing the theory of finite perimeter set in a fairly complete setting.
. A selection from Caccioppoli's scientific works with a biography and a commentary of Mauro Picone.
. Available at Numdam. Cesari's watershed paper, where he extends the now called Tonelli plane variation concept to include in the definition a subclass of the class of integrable functions.
. The first note published by De Giorgi describing his approach to Caccioppoli sets.
. The first complete exposition by De Giorgi of the theory of Caccioppoli sets.
. The first paper of Herbert Federer illustrating his approach to the theory of perimeters based on the theory of currents.
. A paper sketching the history of the theory of sets of finite perimeter, from the seminal paper of Renato Caccioppoli to main discoveries.

Scientific references
. An advanced text, oriented towards the theory of minimal surfaces in the multi-dimensional setting, written by one of the leading contributors.
, particularly chapter 4, paragraph 4.5, sections 4.5.1 to 4.5.4 "Sets with locally finite perimeter". The absolute reference text in geometric measure theory.
, particularly Chapter 3, Section 14 "Sets of Locally Finite Perimeter".
,  particularly part I, chapter 1 "Functions of bounded variation and Caccioppoli sets". A good reference on the theory of Caccioppoli sets and their application to the Minimal surface problem.
, particularly part II, chapter 4 paragraph 2 "Sets with finite perimeter". One of the best books about –functions and their application to problems of mathematical physics, particularly chemical kinetics.
; particularly chapter 6, "On functions in the space ". One of the best monographs on the theory of Sobolev spaces.
. A seminal paper where Caccioppoli sets and –functions are deeply studied and the concept of functional superposition is introduced and applied to the theory of partial differential equations.

External links 

Function of bounded variation at Encyclopedia of Mathematics

Mathematical analysis
Calculus of variations
Measure theory